Marina Panteleyeva (born 16 May 1989) is a Russian sprinter. She competed in the 4 × 100 metres relay event at the 2015 World Championships in Athletics in Beijing, China.

References

External links

1989 births
Living people
Russian female sprinters
World Athletics Championships athletes for Russia
Place of birth missing (living people)
European Athletics Championships medalists